Mandle is a surname. Notable people with the surname include:

Jon Mandle, American philosophy academic
Roger Mandle (1941–2020), American historian, curator, and academic administrator

See also
Mandl
Mandel
Mandler